Mallace is a surname. Notable people with the surname include:

Calum Mallace (born 1990), Scottish-born American soccer player
Craig Mallace (born 1985), Scottish-born American soccer player and coach, brother of Calum

See also
Wallace (surname)